Carl Henry Charon (born March 17, 1940) is a former American football player and coach.  

Charon was born in 1940 in Boyne City, Michigan, and attended Boyne City High School.

He played college football for Michigan State University from 1959 to 1961.

He was selected by the Washington Redskins in the 18th round (239th overall pick) of the 1962 NFL Draft. He instead played in the American Football League (AFL) for the Buffalo Bills in 1962 and 1963. He appeared in 26 AFL games and led the league in 1962 with two non-offensive touchdowns. He also played for the Norfolk Neptunes of the Continental Football League in 1965.

After his playing career, Charon worked as a high school football coach. He compiled a 123-77 record, was named Regional Coach of the Year by the Michigan High School Football Coaches Association (MHSFCA) in 1979, 1983, and 1985.  He was inducted into the MHSFCA Hall of Fame in 1994.

References

1940 births
Living people
American football defensive backs
Michigan State Spartans football players
Buffalo Bills players
Players of American football from Michigan
People from Boyne City, Michigan
American Football League players